On 8 July 2014, a Taliban suicide bomber riding a bicycle attacked a joint Afghan-ISAF reconnaissance mission in the vicinity of Qalandar Khel Village in front of the Korean Clinic.

Events
The attack occurred at approximately 5:15 (UTC) A.M., as the Czech soldiers along with Afghan police, were assessing the security situation in the village in the vicinity of Bagram Airfield. The bomber was in a crowd of Afghans talking to the soldiers who were investigating rocket attacks against Bagram airbase. Two days prior, a rocket was fired at the base from the nearby village of Qalandar Khil. A total of 17+ people died on site; including 10 Afghan civilians, 2 Afghan police officers, and 4 Czech soldiers. A fifth Czech soldier died of wounds six days later in a Prague military hospital.

Fatalities 
Five Czech ISAF soldiers were killed, of the Czech Afghanistan Contingent.

See also
 2007 Bagram Airfield bombing
 2015 Bagram Airfield bombing
 2016 Bagram Airfield bombing

References

2014 murders in Afghanistan
Mass murder in 2014
Terrorist incidents in Afghanistan in 2014
Suicide bombings in Afghanistan
July 2014 events in Afghanistan
Parwan Province